Genesis Revisited: Live at Hammersmith is an album by musician Steve Hackett. It was recorded at the Hammersmith Apollo, during the tour around the release of Genesis Revisited II. It  features a full set from the show performed on 10 May 2013, including 18 Genesis songs, and one solo song, Shadow of the Hierophant, that was originally planned as a Genesis song. The box set features the full live show across three CDs and on one DVD, together with a further DVD containing a Behind the Scenes featurette.

Track listing

Personnel
Band
Steve Hackett – guitar, vocals
Roger King – keyboards
Nad Sylvan – vocals, tambourine
Gary O'Toole – drums, percussion, vocals
Lee Pomeroy – bass, bass pedals, Variax, twelve-string, vocals
Rob Townsend – saxophone, woodwind, percussion, vocals, keyboards

Special guests
Jakko Jakszyk
Nik Kershaw
Amanda Lehmann
Steve Rothery
John Wetton

References

External links
 Album announcement on HackettSongs
 European release on Discogs

2013 live albums
Steve Hackett albums
Inside Out Music live albums